Associazione Calcio Magenta is an Italian association football club located in Magenta, Lombardy. It currently plays in Promozione. Its colors are blue and yellow.

The club was founded in 1945 and spent the 1947–48 season in Serie B North.

References

External links
Official homepage

Football clubs in Lombardy
Association football clubs established in 1945
Serie B clubs
Serie C clubs
Serie D clubs
1945 establishments in Italy